Sisler or Šisler may refer to:

Cathy Sisler, American artist, born in Wisconsin
Dave Sisler (1931–2011), former pitcher who played in Major League Baseball 1956–1962
Dick Sisler (1920–1998), American player, coach and manager in Major League Baseball
George Sisler (disambiguation), several people with this name, including:
George Sisler (1893–1973), American Major League Baseball first baseman and member of the National Baseball Hall of Fame
Jan Šisler (born 1988), footballer from Czech Republic playing currently for FK Jablonec 97
Jiří Šisler (born 1984), Czech footballer

See also
Sisler High School, the largest high school in the province of Manitoba with over 1700 students
USNS Sisler (T-AKR-311), one of Military Sealift Command's nineteen Large, Medium-Speed Roll-on/Roll-off Ships